R. C. Hiremath (kannada:ಆರ್.ಸಿ.ಹಿರೇಮಠ 15 January 1920 Kuradagi, Gadag, Karnataka, India – 3 November 1998 Dharwad, Karnataka, India) was a professor of Kannada and the Vice-Chancellor of Karnataka University, Dharwar after A. S. Adke. Hiremath was the president of the 59th Kannada Sahitya Sammelana. He was a founding member the Dravidian Linguistics Association and the director of International School of Dravidian Linguistics (ISDL) in Trivandrum. His work ranges from creative and critical work to several editorial publications.

Early life and career
After losing his father at an early age and the loss of his mother's eyesight, R. C. Hiremath faced grave difficulties and was forced to provide for his family. He however completed his early education with great distinction and received a M.A. (Bombay University 1945) and PhD (Karnatak University 1955) in Kannada. He started his career as a professor of Kannada at Basaveshwar College, Bagalkot. He soon joined the emerging department of Kannada in Karnatak University, Dharwad as a reader, and went on to build a full-fledged Institute of Kannada studies. In recognition of his contribution to the institute, the institute was named after Dr. Hiremath posthumously. He and his team at the institute gathered an extensive collection of rare manuscripts and conducted research. This effort resulted in publication of several important Kannada works especially in the field of Vachana Sahitya.

Hiremath had post-doctoral training in Modern Linguistics at the University of California, Berkeley, USA on a Rockefeller Foundation senior fellowship for a period of 3 years. He was later instrumental in setting up the study of Linguistics at Karnatak University and participated in several Dravidian Linguistics conferences.

Administrative career
During his illustrious academic career at Karnatak University, Dr. Hiremath also took interest in several non-academic activities as a member of various committees including the syndicate and academic council. In 1974, he was called upon to fill in as the acting Vice-Chancellor when the incumbent Smt. Jayalakshammani could not perform her duties due to illness. He was later confirmed as the Vice-Chancellor from 1 May 1975 to 30 April 1978. During his tenure, the university celebrated its Silver Jubilee and flourished with significant investment in infrastructure. The establishment of the Music Department and the Yoga studies stand out among his unique achievements during his tenure as Vice-Chancellor. In the music department, he organised some of the most renowned exponents of the Hindustani Classical Music under one umbrella under the leadership of Padma Vibhushan Pandit Mallikarjun Mansur.

References

Further reading
 Hiremath's views on Buddhism in North Karnataka
https://www.vedicbooks.net/buddhism-karnataka-p-15777.html
 Hiremath listed in who's who of Indian writers
 Kannada article on Dr. R. C. Hiremath
 Another link for the above article
 Dr. Hiremath on Lingayat Religion
 Dr. Hiremath listed as one of prominent Lingayats
  Dr. Hiremath referenced in :'Revolution of the Mystics: On the Social Aspects of Vīraśaivism By Jan Peter Schouten'
 Dr. Hiremath's publications listed as references in 'Religion and Social System of the Vīraśaiva Community By Danesh A. Chekki'
 Dr. Hiremath's publications listed as references in 'The Origins of Vīraśaiva Sects: A Typological Analysis of Ritual and ... edited by R. Blake Michael'
Dr. Hiremath's 'Shunyasampadane' referenced in:
 1) The Alchemical Body: Siddha Traditions in Medieval India By David Gordon White
 2) Encyclopedia of Hinduism edited by Denise Cush, Catherine Robinson, Michael York
 3) The Many Colors of Hinduism: A Thematic-historical Introduction, By Carl Olso
 Dr. Hiremath's work in Folk Literature referenced in 'Folktales Told Around the World edited by Richard Mercer Dorson'

Indian academic administrators
Kannada-language writers
1920 births
Kannada people
1998 deaths
20th-century Indian linguists
Academic staff of Karnatak University
Heads of universities and colleges in India